Marta Larraechea Bolívar (born August 30, 1944 in Constitución, Talca Province) is a social orientator, politician and wife of Chilean President Eduardo Frei Ruiz-Tagle. She was a council member of the Santiago municipality (2000–2004) and First Lady of Chile (1994–2000). She is of Basque descent. She is the daughter of Vasco de Larraechea Herrera and Victoria Bolívar Le Fort.

She studied as a child at "Inmaculada Concepción" school in Concepción, Secretaryship and Social Orientation at Instituto Carlos Casanueva. She  and Eduardo Frei Ruiz-Tagle were married on November 30, 1967 and they have four children, Verónica, Cecilia, Magdalena and Catalina. She identifies as a Roman Catholic and close friend of Hillary Clinton and Carlos Menem.

Electoral Resume

Municipal Elections 2000
Municipal Elections 2000 for Santiago mayoralty '''

See also
First Ladies of Chile
Frei family

References

External links 

1944 births
Living people
People from Constitución, Chile
Chilean Roman Catholics
Chilean people of Basque descent
Chilean people of French descent
First ladies of Chile
Christian Democratic Party (Chile) politicians
Dames Grand Cross of the Order of Isabella the Catholic